Ladysmith may refer to:

 Ladysmith, KwaZulu-Natal, South Africa
 Ladysmith, British Columbia, Canada
 Ladysmith, Wisconsin, United States
 Ladysmith, New South Wales, Australia
 Ladysmith, Virginia, United States
 Ladysmith Island, Queensland, Australia, an island in Smith Islands National Park

Other
 Ladysmith (novel), a 1999 novel by Giles Foden
 Ladysmith Black Mambazo, a South African choral group
 Siege of Ladysmith (South Africa), 1900
 Smith & Wesson Ladysmith, a small handgun

See also
 Lady Smith (disambiguation)
 List of people with surname Smith
 Ladismith, Western Cape, South Africa